Konrad Emanuel Nikolaus Hirsch (19 May 1900 – 17 November 1924) was a Norwegian-born Swedish football (soccer) player who competed in the 1924 Summer Olympics. He was a member of the Swedish team, which won the bronze medal in the football tournament.

Hirsch was born in Eidskog, Norway and died in Surte, Sweden.

References

External links
 
 
 

1900 births
1924 deaths
Swedish footballers
Footballers at the 1924 Summer Olympics
Olympic footballers of Sweden
Olympic bronze medalists for Sweden
Sweden international footballers
Olympic medalists in football
Medalists at the 1924 Summer Olympics
Association football defenders
People from Eidskog
GAIS players